Lindy Elkins-Tanton is a planetary scientist and professor; her research concerns terrestrial planetary evolution. She is the Principal Investigator of NASA's Psyche mission to explore the metallic asteroid 16 Psyche, Arizona State University Vice President of the Interplanetary Initiative, and co-founder of Beagle Learning, a tech company training and measuring collaborative problem-solving and critical thinking.

Career
Dr. Elkins-Tanton earned her B.S. in geology, M.S. in geochemistry, and Ph.D. in geology, all from the Massachusetts Institute of Technology (MIT) in Cambridge, Massachusetts. She was a professor at MIT, a research scientist at Brown University, and a lecturer at St. Mary's College of Maryland, and worked in the business world for a number of years. Within 10 years of completing her Ph.D. and serving as an associate professor in geology at MIT, she was recruited to the directorship position at the Carnegie Institution for Science's Department of Terrestrial Magnetism. She became the director of Arizona State University's School of Earth and Space Science on July 1, 2014.

Elkins-Tanton leads NASA's Psyche mission to explore the metallic asteroid 16 Psyche. On January 4, 2017, NASA announced the mission had been selected to proceed to mission formulation. Elkins-Tanton is the second woman to lead a NASA mission to a major solar system body.

Elkins-Tanton is also a Co-Founder of and the Higher Education Lead for Beagle Learning, which provides software tools and coaching that make exploration-based learning techniques accessible.

Awards and honors
Elkins-Tanton was twice named a National Academy of Sciences Kavli Frontiers of Science Fellow. She was awarded a five-year National Science Foundation CAREER award in 2008 and was named Outstanding MIT Faculty Undergraduate Research Mentor in 2009. In 2010, she was awarded the Explorers Club Lowell Thomas prize for Exploring Extinction. In 2013, she was named an Astor Fellow at the University of Oxford hosted by Tamsin Mather. In 2016 she was named a fellow of the American Geophysical Union. In 2020 she was awarded the Arthur L. Day Prize and Lectureship. Asteroid 8252 Elkins-Tanton is named after her. She is a member of the National Academy of Sciences and of the American Academy of Arts & Sciences, and in 2022 William Morrow published her memoir, A Portrait of the Scientist as a Young Woman.

In 2022, a newly discovered mineral, elkinstantonite, found in the El Ali meteorite, was named after Elkins-Tanton by Dr. Andrew Locock of the University of Alberta.

Selected publications

See also
List of women in leadership positions on astronomical instrumentation projects

References

External links
 Dr. Lindy Elkins-Tanton: Let go of the myth that a successful scientist follows a certain path
 Arizona State University Psyche mission

Living people
Planetary scientists
Women planetary scientists
Year of birth missing (living people)
Members of the United States National Academy of Sciences
Arizona State University faculty
American women astronomers
20th-century American astronomers
20th-century American women scientists
21st-century American astronomers
21st-century American women scientists
Massachusetts Institute of Technology alumni
Massachusetts Institute of Technology faculty
St. Mary's College of Maryland faculty
Brown University faculty